The Keeper of the Flame Tour was the sixth headlining concert tour by American country music artist Miranda Lambert. It began on April 30, 2016, in Austin, Texas, and finished on September 10, 2016, in West Palm Beach, Florida. In between dates on this tour, Lambert opened up for Kenny Chesney on his Spread the Love Tour. The tour was first announced on Lambert's website in January 2016. The last three shows were cancelled due to Lambert being put on mandated vocal rest.

Concert synopsis
For this tour Lambert will switch up the setlist by performing old songs, new covers.

Opening acts
Kip Moore
Brothers Osborne

Setlist
{{hidden
| headercss = background: #ccccff; font-size: 100%; width: 59%;
| contentcss = text-align: left; font-size: 100%; width: 75%;
| header = Setlist I
| content = Setlist performed in Maryland Heights
"Fastest Girl in Town"
"Baggage Claim"
"Kerosene"
"Heart Like Mine"
"Bathroom Sink"
"Slow Ride" 
"Willin'" 
"Over You"
"Famous in a Small Town"
"All Kinds of Kinds"
"The House That Built Me"
"Mama's Broken Heart"
"Dead Flowers"
"Covered Wagon"
"Automatic"
"White Liar"
"Your/"Little Red Wagon"
"Gunpowder & Lead"
Encore
"Dear Diamond" 
}}
{{hidden
| headercss = background: #ccccff; font-size: 100%; width: 59%;
| contentcss = text-align: left; font-size: 100%; width: 75%;
| header = Setlist II
| content = Setlist performed in Bethel, Virginia Beach, Bristow
"Fastest Girl in Town"
"Baggage Claim"
"Kerosene"
"Heart Like Mine"
"Bathroom Sink"
"Mississippi Queen" 
"Sweet Be Sweet" 
"Over You"
"Famous in a Small Town"
"All Kinds of Kinds"
"The House That Built Me"
"Mama's Broken Heart"
"Dead Flowers"
"Covered Wagon"
"Automatic"
"White Liar"
"Little Red Wagon"
"Gunpowder & Lead"
Encore
"Willin'" 
"Me and Bobby McGee" 

}}

Tour dates

list of festivals

Cancellations and rescheduled shows

References

2016 concert tours
Miranda Lambert concert tours